The women's 200m freestyle events at the 2022 World Para Swimming Championships were held at the Penteada Olympic Swimming Complex in Madeira between 12 and 18 June.

Medalists

Results

S2
Final
Two swimmers from two nations took part.

S3

S4

S5

S14
Heats
13 swimmers from eight nations took part. The swimmers with the top eight times, regardless of heat, advanced to the final.

Final
The final was held on 12 June 2022.

References

2022 World Para Swimming Championships
2022 in women's swimming